Super Bowl LIII was an American football game played to determine the champion of the National Football League (NFL) for the 2018 season. The American Football Conference (AFC) champion New England Patriots defeated the National Football Conference (NFC) champion Los Angeles Rams, 13–3. The game was played on February 3, 2019, at Mercedes-Benz Stadium in Atlanta and was the first Super Bowl played at the stadium.

The Patriots' victory was their sixth, tying the Pittsburgh Steelers for the most Super Bowl championships. New England, after finishing the regular season with an 11–5 record, advanced to their 11th Super Bowl appearance, their third in a row, and their ninth under the leadership of head coach Bill Belichick and quarterback Tom Brady. The Rams finished the regular season with a 13–3 record under head coach Sean McVay, the youngest head coach in the Super Bowl at 33, as they advanced to their fourth Super Bowl appearance and their first since relocating back from St. Louis to Los Angeles in 2016. Super Bowl LIII was a rematch of 2001's Super Bowl XXXVI, the first championship won by Belichick and Brady and the beginning of the Patriots dynasty. It was the 14th meeting in a major sports championship between the Greater Los Angeles and Greater Boston areas and the first championship between the two regions in the NFL. The game also marked the first Super Bowl appearance of a Los Angeles-based team since the Los Angeles Raiders appeared in 1983's Super Bowl XVIII and the Rams' first as a Los Angeles team since 1979's Super Bowl XIV.

Super Bowl LIII was the lowest-scoring Super Bowl in NFL history. The game marked the first Super Bowl in which neither team had a touchdown through the first three quarters, as the Patriots and the Rams fought to a 3–3 tie entering the fourth. In the final quarter, New England scored 10 unanswered points to claim victory, including the game's only touchdown by running back Sony Michel. The Patriots' one touchdown tied them with the New York Jets in Super Bowl III for the fewest by a winning Super Bowl team, while the Rams became the second Super Bowl team to not score a touchdown after the Miami Dolphins in Super Bowl VI. Patriots wide receiver Julian Edelman, who caught 10 passes for 141 yards, was named Super Bowl MVP. Brady and Belichick became the oldest starting quarterback and head coach to win the Super Bowl at 41 and 66, respectively, and Brady was also the first starting quarterback to win the Super Bowl in his 40s. It marked the final Super Bowl of the Patriots dynasty, as Brady departed New England after the 2019 season.

The broadcast of the game on CBS, along with the halftime show headlined by U.S. pop group Maroon 5, saw the smallest Super Bowl audience in 10 years. Due to its low-scoring nature and both teams' offensive struggles, the game has been regarded as one of the worst Super Bowls, although the defensive performances of both teams are considered among the greatest.

YouTuber MrBeast advertised a campaign for PewDiePie's YouTube channel at the Super Bowl, as part of the PewDiePie vs T-Series rivalry.

Background

Host-selection process

On May 19, 2015, the league announced the four finalists that would compete to host Super Bowl LIII in 2019, LIV in 2020 and LV in 2021. NFL owners voted on these cities on May 24, 2016, with the first round of voting determining the host for Super Bowl LIII, the second round deciding a different site for Super Bowl LIV and the third round deciding the site for Super Bowl LV. The four finalists for Super Bowl LIII, all in the Southeastern United States, were:
 Mercedes-Benz Stadium, Atlanta: This would be the first Super Bowl played at Mercedes-Benz Stadium after it opened in 2017. The city had previously hosted two Super Bowls at the Georgia Dome, with the last being Super Bowl XXXIV in 2000.
 Hard Rock Stadium, Miami Gardens, Florida: South Florida had previously hosted 10 Super Bowls, with the last being Super Bowl XLIV in 2010.
 Mercedes-Benz Superdome, New Orleans, Louisiana: New Orleans had previously hosted 10 Super Bowls, with the last being Super Bowl XLVII in 2013.
 Raymond James Stadium, Tampa, Florida: Tampa had hosted four Super Bowls, with the last being Super Bowl XLIII in 2009.

After three votes, Atlanta was awarded Super Bowl LIII at the NFL owners' meeting on May 24, 2016. The losing candidates, except for New Orleans which removed itself from the voting for all games except Super Bowl LIII due to event conflicts in 2020 and 2021, were then pitted against SoFi Stadium in Inglewood, California for Super Bowl LIV and Super Bowl LV hosting rights. Miami eventually won the rights to host Super Bowl LIV and Los Angeles won the rights to host Super Bowl LV. However on May 23, 2017, NFL owners opted to award Super Bowl LV to Tampa and give Super Bowl LVI to Los Angeles after it was announced that SoFi Stadium would open in 2020 due to construction delays. New Orleans would be awarded Super Bowl LVIII.

The NFL unveiled the official logo for Super Bowl LIII in February 2018; it is a navy blue-tinted version of the design that was introduced at Super Bowl LI, and the overall branding of the game featured use of blue and red. The host committee logo featured a stylized overhead rendition of Mercedes-Benz Stadium's roof.

Teams

New England Patriots

The Patriots finished the 2018 season with an 11–5 record to earn the #2 seed in the AFC and their 17th season with at least ten wins in their 19 years under 66-year-old head coach Bill Belichick. They went on to join the Miami Dolphins and Buffalo Bills as the only teams in NFL history to ever reach three consecutive Super Bowls. Though the team had only two Pro Bowl selections, they scored 436 points (fourth in the league) while giving up only 325 (seventh fewest).

Patriots quarterback Tom Brady earned his 14th Pro Bowl selection at age 41, finishing the season with 4,355 passing yards and 29 touchdowns, with only 11 interceptions, while also rushing for 35 yards and two more scores on the ground. These totals made him just the second quarterback in NFL history to amass 70,000 career passing yards and 1,000 rushing yards. His top receiver from the previous season, Brandin Cooks, was traded to the eventual Super Bowl rival Rams, but Julian Edelman, who not only had missed the previous season with an torn ACL injury but was suspended for the first four games of the regular season after testing positive for PEDs, returned to catch 74 receptions for a team-leading 850 yards and six touchdowns, while also returning 20 punts for 154 yards. Other key receivers included Chris Hogan (35 receptions for 553 yards and three touchdowns) and Josh Gordon (40 receptions for 720 yards and three touchdowns), though Gordon would end up leaving the team to focus on his mental health after 11 games when faced with a suspension for violating the league's substance abuse policy. Tight end Rob Gronkowski added 47 receptions for 682 yards and three touchdowns. Meanwhile, the running game featured a dynamic new weapon, rookie halfback Sony Michel, who lead the team with 931 rushing yards and 6 touchdowns, along with veteran James White who racked up 1,176 yards from scrimmage while leading the team in receptions (87) and total touchdowns (12). On special teams, receiver Cordarrelle Patterson returned 23 kickoffs for 663 yards and a touchdown, an average of 28.8 yards per return (third in the NFL), while also catching 21 passes for 247 yards, rushing for 228 yards and scoring four touchdowns on offense.

On defense, defensive end Trey Flowers led the team with 7.5 sacks and also forced three fumbles. Linebacker Kyle Van Noy led the team in total tackles (92), while also recording 3.5 sacks, a forced fumble and two fumble recoveries. In the secondary, safety Duron Harmon led the team in interceptions for the second year in a row with four, while Pro Bowl cornerback Stephon Gilmore intercepted two passes and forced two fumbles. Safety Patrick Chung also made an impact with 84 total tackles to go with an interception and a fumble recovery. The Patriots secondary also featured twin brothers Jason McCourty and Devin McCourty, who both had an interception each. Devin had 82 tackles, while Jason had 70.

Los Angeles Rams

The Rams finished the 2018 season earning the #2 seed in the NFC, before knocking off the fourth seeded Dallas Cowboys in the divisional round and top seeded New Orleans Saints in the NFC Championship to earn their fourth Super Bowl in franchise history. The Rams went from 2004 to 2016 without recording a winning record. After relocating from St. Louis back to Los Angeles and posting a dismal 4–12 season in 2016, the team's fortunes changed with the hiring of 30-year-old head coach Sean McVay, the youngest head coach in NFL history. Under McVay and second year quarterback Jared Goff, who recovered from a lackluster winless rookie season to record a triple digit passer rating, the Rams improved to an 11–5 record in 2017. Then in 2018, they won their first eight games and finished the year with a 13–3 record, tying the Saints for the best record in the NFC. New Orleans won the top seed since they had defeated the Rams in the regular season.

The Rams offense ranked second in the NFL in both points scored (527) and yards gained (6,738). Goff continued to improve in his third season, setting new career highs in passing yards (4,688, fourth in the NFL), passing touchdowns (32), passer rating (101.1), rushing yards (108) and rushing touchdowns (two). His top receiver was Robert Woods, who caught 86 passes for 1,219 yards and 6 touchdowns. Brandin Cooks, an off-season pickup from the Patriots via trade, also made a big impact with 80 receptions for 1,204 yards and 5 scores. The team's #3 receiver, Cooper Kupp, suffered a season ending injury after catching 40 passes for 566 yards in 8 games, forcing Goff to rely heavily on other targets like Gerald Everett (32 receptions) and Josh Reynolds (29). Pro Bowl running back Todd Gurley was the team's leading rusher with 1,251 yards (fourth in the NFL) and 17 touchdowns, while also catching 59 passes for 580 yards and five more touchdowns. His 17 rushing touchdowns led the league, while his 22 total touchdowns gave him 132 points, fifth in the NFL. Running back C. J. Anderson, who made the Rams his third different team in 2018 after signing up with them in December, also was a key aspect of the running game, finishing the season with 405 yards and leading the team in rushing in both of their playoff victories. On special teams, JoJo Natson returned 26 punts for 280 yards, while kicker Greg Zuerlein made 87.1% of his field goals, including a franchise postseason record 57-yard kick to defeat the Saints in overtime in the NFC championship game.

The Rams defense featured Pro Bowl defensive tackle Aaron Donald, who led the league in sacks with 20.5, as many sacks as the rest of the team combined. He also had 59 tackles (25 for loss), four forced fumbles and two fumble recoveries. Veteran defensive lineman Ndamukong Suh was second on the team with 4.5 sacks, while also getting 59 tackles and recovering two fumbles. Pro Bowl linebacker Cory Littleton led the team in total tackles with 125, while also picking up four sacks, three interceptions and blocking two punts. The Rams also had a strong secondary, led by John Johnson (119 tackles and four interceptions), Marcus Peters (three interceptions), Lamarcus Joyner (78 tackles) and Aqib Talib.

Playoffs

In the playoffs, the Patriots earned a first-round bye as the AFC's second overall seed. In the divisional round, they defeated the Los Angeles Chargers 41–28, scoring touchdowns on five of their first six possessions. Brady passed for 343 yards and a touchdown, while running back Sony Michel rushed for 129 yards and three touchdowns. They then defeated the Kansas City Chiefs 37–31 in the AFC Championship Game, scoring the game-winning touchdown in overtime. The Patriots held a 14–0 lead at halftime, before the Chiefs rallied to take the lead 21–17 in the fourth quarter. From there, both teams took turns taking the lead, until the Chiefs forced overtime with a 39-yard field goal by Harrison Butker to tie the game 31–31. The Patriots won the coin toss to start their offense for overtime, where Rex Burkhead scored a two-yard touchdown to win the game. Michel ended up rushing for a combined total of 242 yards and five touchdowns in the Patriots' two playoff games, setting an NFL record for postseason rushing touchdowns by a rookie. The Patriots defense held Chiefs wide receiver Tyreek Hill and tight end Travis Kelce, who had both gained over 1,300 receiving yards during the season, to a combined total of just four receptions for 65 yards.

Meanwhile, the Rams also had a first-round bye as the NFC's second overall seed. They started off the divisional round by defeating the Dallas Cowboys 30–22. The Rams gained 273 yards on the ground with running backs Todd Gurley and C. J. Anderson rushing for over 100 yards each. They then defeated the New Orleans Saints 26–23 in the NFC Championship Game, scoring a game-winning field goal in overtime. The Saints jumped out to an early 13–0 first quarter lead, before the Rams rallied to close the lead to 13–10 at halftime. In the fourth quarter, Greg Zuerlein tied the game at 20–20, with just over 5 minutes remaining. The Saints moved the ball to the Rams' 13 yard line, but could not gain a first down. On third down, quarterback Drew Brees threw a pass to receiver Tommylee Lewis, who was covered by Nickell Robey-Coleman. Though Robey-Coleman knocked Lewis to the ground early and the pass fell incomplete, the obvious penalty was not called and the Saints' Wil Lutz kicked a 31-yard field goal to take the lead. The Rams took possession and sent the game to overtime with a 48-yard field goal by Greg Zuerlein. Although the Rams lost the coin toss and had to start their defense for overtime, Brees threw an interception on the Saints' first drive and Zuerlein kicked a 57-yard field goal to win the game.

Pre-game notes
The game was a rematch of Super Bowl XXXVI between the Patriots and the Rams; the Rams at the time were based in St. Louis. However, only one player, Patriots starting quarterback Tom Brady, remained on either roster from that contest. Bill Belichick, the Patriots' head coach in the previous contest, also remained in that position for this game. Super Bowl LIII featured record setting age differences between each team's starting quarterbacks and head coaches, pitting 41-year-old Brady against 24-year-old Jared Goff, as well as 66-year-old Belichick against 33-year-old Sean McVay.

The then-St. Louis Rams won their sole Super Bowl title in Atlanta, Super Bowl XXXIV, hosted at the now-demolished Georgia Dome in 2000, which was located adjacent to Mercedes-Benz Stadium.

As the designated home team in the annual rotation between AFC and NFC teams, the Rams elected to wear their royal blue and yellow throwback uniforms for the game, which they have previously worn for six home games including a home playoff game during the 2018 season. The Patriots wore their standard white away uniforms.

Gambling establishments had the Patriots as 2 ½ point favorites and projected 56 total points would be scored.

Boston and Los Angeles teams of other professional sports have met in the championship rounds, popularizing the "Beat L.A." chant and the hashtag "#BeatLA". The Boston Celtics and Los Angeles Lakers have contested a record eleven NBA Finals since the Lakers moved from Minneapolis in 1960. Furthermore, Los Angeles Galaxy and New England Revolution have contested three MLS Cups. The Boston Red Sox and Los Angeles Dodgers faced off in the 2018 World Series, and with the Patriots and Rams meeting in Super Bowl LIII, it was only the second time in 50 years that two cities' MLB and NFL teams have competed for the league title in the same season (or calendar year), the first time being in 1969 when the New York Jets and Baltimore Colts competed for Super Bowl III in January 1969 followed by the 1969 World Series featuring the New York Mets and Baltimore Orioles. The Patriots faced another Los Angeles-based team in the same playoffs, the Chargers in the divisional round, en route to their Super Bowl meeting with the Rams.

Associated events

Pre-game events and entertainment were centered around downtown Atlanta, with State Farm Arena having hosted Super Bowl Opening Night, the Georgia World Congress Center hosting the Super Bowl Experience and Super Bowl Live at Centennial Olympic Park. State Farm Arena also hosted the inaugural Bud Light Super Bowl Music Fest, a three-night concert series that was headlined by Ludacris and Migos (night 1), Aerosmith and Post Malone (night 2), and Bruno Mars and Cardi B (night 3). The show competed with a "Super Saturday Night" concert held by DirecTV at a temporary venue near Atlantic Station, headlined by the Foo Fighters and featuring Roger Taylor, Zac Brown, Tom Morello, Perry Farrell and Dave Koz as special guests.

The NFL officially launched its centennial commemorations at Super Bowl LIII, ahead of its 100th season. A themed, two-minute advertisement was aired during the game.

Broadcasting

United States
CBS broadcast Super Bowl LIII as part of an annual rotation between the three main broadcast television partners of the NFL; it was the 20th time CBS has broadcast the game. As with CBS's most recent Super Bowl (Super Bowl 50), ESPN Deportes aired a Spanish-language broadcast of the game (additional to CBS's SAP channel Spanish version). CBS' coverage utilized a total of 115 cameras, including 8K resolution cameras (for the first time in a U.S. network sports telecast) in the end zones, as well as field-level and "up close" augmented reality graphics (with the latter generated by a wireless, handheld camera).

Digitally, the game was available via the CBS Sports app, CBSSports.com, the Yahoo! Sports app, Tumblr app, the NFL app and through CBS's subscription service CBS All Access. The Yahoo! Sports app and Tumblr app streams are part of a long-term deal between then NFL and Verizon Media.

Westwood One affiliates carried the game on radio for free, with SiriusXM carrying the game in eight languages and hometown broadcasts from Boston's WBZ-FM and Los Angeles's KSPN and KCBS-FM, along with the main feed on Sirius XM NFL Radio.

Advertising
With a base price slightly higher than $5 million for a 30-second ad, the cost of commercial time remained even with the previous three events. There were fewer spots sold overall in comparison to the previous Super Bowl; CBS aired more than double the number of promos for its own programming (as well as that of its subscription service CBS All Access) than NBC did at Super Bowl LII. Despite this, Kantar estimated its total revenue to be the third-highest in Super Bowl history, at $382 million.

Perennial Super Bowl advertiser Anheuser-Busch made its largest-ever advertising purchase for a single game, with a total of eight different commercials of various lengths (covering five-and-a-half minutes of airtime) across seven product brands, including three being advertised during the game for the first time. Mercedes-Benz aired a minute long ad for the 2019 A-Class Sedan featuring cameos by Ludacris. Walt Disney Studios Motion Pictures aired a half-minute long Teaser for highly anticipated Avengers: Endgame. CBS rejected an ad from medical cannabis company Acreage Holdings advocating for legalization.

For the first time in its history, the NFL itself won USA Todays Super Bowl Ad Meter survey determining the best commercial aired during the game, with an advertisement launching a campaign celebrating its 100th season.

Lead-out programs
CBS's lead-out program was the series premiere of the talent competition series The World's Best. After late local programs, CBS also aired a special Sunday-night episode of The Late Show with Stephen Colbert.

Ratings
Initial overnight Nielsen Ratings measured a 44.9 rating for the game, down 5% from the previous year and the lowest rating for a Super Bowl since Super Bowl XLIII ten years prior. 98.2 million viewers were measured, the fewest since Super Bowl XLII. Jemele Hill of The Atlantic attributed the low ratings "to the game being the lowest-scoring Super Bowl ever, moderate national interest in the Rams, the lingering bad taste from the huge blown call in the NFC Championship Game, and Patriots fatigue". In New Orleans, whose Saints had lost the NFC Championship in part because of the blown call, ratings were down 51% compared to Super Bowl LII as Louisianans boycotted and refused to watch the game. Outside the Boston market, where the 57.1 overnight rating was the highest among local markets, the highest-rated markets were in Richmond, Virginia and Buffalo, New York (the latter having traditionally high ratings for sporting events and being the home of the Patriots' division rivals the Buffalo Bills); Los Angeles was near the national average. A downturn of approximately 5% was noted during the halftime show. The fewer television viewers did not migrate to online or mobile platforms; viewership online and on mobile only totaled 2.5 million viewers, which was not an appreciable enough change to affect the overall viewership decline.

International
In Canada, the game was aired by CTV, CTV 2 and TSN. Unifor purchased time on the Canadian broadcast to air an attack ad criticizing General Motors' decision to close the Oshawa Car Assembly plant, defying demands from the company to pull the ad because they deemed it to be misleading.

In Australia and New Zealand, ESPN Australia aired an ESPN-produced broadcast of the game that featured the Monday Night Football commentary crew of Joe Tessitore, Jason Witten and Booger McFarland (McFarland was in the booth rather than the Booger Mobile, the controversial sideline vehicle he used that was abandoned before the end of the 2018 MNF season). It would prove to be Witten's last commentary appearance for the time being, due to his unretirement and return to the Dallas Cowboys. Additionally in Australia the game was broaadcast for the second year in a row by Melbourne Radio Station 1116 SEN and commentated by Gerard Whateley.

In the United Kingdom and Ireland, the game was broadcast on the free-to-air channel BBC One, and paid-subscription channels Sky Sports Main Event, Sky Sports Mix and Sky Sports USA.

Entertainment
The musical artists who agreed to perform at the show—including Gladys Knight, Maroon 5, Travis Scott, and Big Boi—were criticized by media outlets, other artists and members of the public for performing at Super Bowl LIII because of the NFL's alleged blacklisting of Colin Kaepernick for protesting police brutality by kneeling during the pre-game national anthem. Several artists, including Jay-Z and Cardi B, turned down offers to perform at the game in support of Kaepernick.

Quinton Peron and Napoleon Jinnies became the first male cheerleaders to perform at a major US sporting event. Scott Winer was the first openly gay cameraman to film the Super Bowl.

Pre-game
The NFL had Mercedes-Benz Stadium's retractable roof open for the pre-game ceremonies and closed it prior to kickoff.

Atlanta natives Chloe x Halle performed "America the Beautiful". Gladys Knight, also from Atlanta, performed "The Star-Spangled Banner". D.C. resident Aarron Loggins performed a sign-language interpretation for both songs.

Bernice King—the daughter of Martin Luther King Jr.—and civil rights movement leaders Andrew Young and John Lewis participated in the coin toss ceremony. King had the honors of flipping the coin.

Halftime show

On January 13, 2019, the NFL announced that pop band Maroon 5 would headline the Super Bowl LIII halftime show. They were joined by Big Boi of Outkast and Travis Scott as guests. A short clip featuring the cast of SpongeBob SquarePants and a clip from the 2001 episode "Band Geeks" was aired as a tribute to series creator Stephen Hillenburg, who died in November 2018 due to amyotrophic lateral sclerosis (ALS). The full clip of the "Sweet Victory" song, including a dedication to Hillenburg, was played inside the stadium prior to the game.

Game summary

First half
The Patriots received first possession as Cordarrelle Patterson returned the opening kickoff 38 yards to the Patriots' 39-yard line and the team picked up 27 yards with their next five plays. But on Tom Brady's first pass attempt of the day, Nickell Robey-Coleman, who was notable for a non-call on pass interference in the NFC Championship two weeks earlier, deflected the ball, allowing linebacker Cory Littleton to make an interception. The turnover had no avail, and following a punt, the Patriots drove 45 yards in 11 plays, the longest a 19-yard catch by tight end Rob Gronkowski. Placekicker Stephen Gostkowski missed a field goal attempt from 46 yards, still keeping the score at zero. The Rams were again unable to move the ball and again, the Patriots threatened to score when Brady completed a 25-yard pass to Julian Edelman at the Rams 45-yard line. But on the next play, Brady was sacked by defensive end John Franklin-Myers and fumbled the ball. Center David Andrews recovered the fumble, but the team was only able to get as far as the Rams' 40 before 4th down and had to punt with 18 seconds left in the first quarter.

After forcing another three-and-out, the Patriots managed to drive 39 yards in seven plays, most of which came from another 25-yard completion from Brady to Edelman. Gostkowski finished the possession with a 42-yard field goal, giving the team a 3–0 lead with 10:29 left in the second quarter. After the next three drives ended in punts, the Patriots took the ball and drove 36 yards to the Rams 32-yard line. But on a 4th-and-1 conversion attempt, Brady threw an incomplete pass with 1:16 left on the clock.

The two teams went into their locker rooms with the Patriots leading, 3–0, the second lowest halftime score in Super Bowl history and the lowest since the 2–0 halftime score in Super Bowl IX after the 1974 season. In the entire first half, the Rams had gained just 57 yards and two first downs, both record lows for coach Sean McVay. This was also the first time that McVay's Rams had ever been shut out in a first half.

Second half
The defensive battle continued into the second half as both teams punted twice (one of them was a Super Bowl record 65-yard punt by the Rams' Johnny Hekker). With 6:33 left in the third quarter, the Rams opened their first drive of more than five plays and their first not to end in a punt, moving the ball 42 yards in 10 plays. On the third play of the drive, Jared Goff completed a 15-yard pass to Brandin Cooks and later made his first third-down conversion with an 18-yard pass to Robert Woods on 3rd-and-6. On 3rd-and-7 from the Patriots' 26-yard line, Goff was sacked for a 9-yard loss by Dont'a Hightower, but Greg Zuerlein was able to pull off a 53-yard field goal, the second-longest in Super Bowl history, to tie the game at 3–3 with 2:11 left in the third quarter. It would be their only score. The Patriots took the ball back and drove to the Rams' 44-yard line, but could not go any further and had to punt on the first play of the fourth quarter. For the first time in Super Bowl history, both teams had gone three quarters without scoring a touchdown.

After forcing the Rams to punt, the Patriots mounted the longest drive of the game as Brady completed an 18-yard pass to Gronkowski, a 13-yard pass to Edelman, a 7-yard pass to running back Rex Burkhead and a 29-yard pass to Gronkowski, bringing them to the Rams' 2-yard line. On the next play, Sony Michel gave the Patriots the lead with a touchdown run, extending his rookie postseason rushing touchdown record to six. With the extra point by Gostkowski, the Patriots had a 10–3 lead with seven minutes left in regulation. On the first play of the Rams' next drive, Goff completed a 19-yard pass to Cooks and later converted a 3rd-and-9 with an 11-yard throw to Josh Reynolds. On the next play, his 17-yard completion to Woods moved the ball to the Patriots' 27-yard line. But with just over 4 minutes left in the game, Goff threw a pass that was intercepted by Stephon Gilmore on the 3-yard line.

The Rams needed to force a punt or turnover, however were unable to contain the Patriots on the ground. On the second play of the Patriots' possession, Michel stormed through the line for a 26-yard run. After he picked up 10 more yards with his next two carries, Burkhead's 26-yard run gave the Patriots a first down on the Rams' 33-yard line. Three plays later, Gostkowski succeeded on a 41-yard field goal, giving the Patriots a 13–3 lead with 1:12 left on the clock. Taking the ball back on their own 25, Goff completed a 10-yard pass to Woods, as well as completions to Cooks for gains of 24 and 21 yards, moving the ball to the Patriots' 30-yard line. With 8 seconds left, the Rams decided to kick a field goal, which would have been followed by an onside kick attempt, but Zuerlein missed wide left from 48 yards and the Patriots ran out the last few seconds of the game clock.

Totals
Brady completed 21 of 35 passes for 262 yards, with one interception. Edelman was his top target with 10 receptions for 141 yards, while Gronkowski made six receptions for 87 yards in his final game with the Patriots. Michel was the top rusher of the game with 94 yards and a touchdown. Gilmore had five solo tackles and an interception. Goff finished the day 19-for-38 passing, for 229 yards and an interception. Cooks was his top receiver with eight receptions for 120 yards. Littleton had 10 tackles (six solo) and an interception. Hekker punted nine times for 417 yards, an average of 46.3 yards per punt, and put five punts inside the 20. The Rams were only the second team in Super Bowl history to not score a touchdown, the first having been the Miami Dolphins in Super Bowl VI after the 1971 season.

Brady became the first player in NFL history to win six Super Bowls, surpassing Charles Haley's only NFL record of five. Brady, also, at age 41, became the oldest quarterback to win and appear in a Super Bowl (although he did not play, the oldest quarterback ever to appear in a Super Bowl was Steve DeBerg in Super Bowl XXXIII at the age of 45), and, at the time, Bill Belichick was the oldest coach to win a Super Bowl, at age 66, until Bruce Arians surpassed that record at age 68 in Super Bowl LV. Edelman was named the Super Bowl Most Valuable Player, and he was the first wide receiver to win the award since Santonio Holmes in Super Bowl XLIII after the 2008 season. Despite holding the Rams to just three points, no Patriots defender received a vote.

Box score

Final statistics

Statistical comparison

Individual statistics

1Completions/attempts2Carries3Long gain4Receptions5Times targeted

Starting lineups

Officials
Super Bowl LIII had seven officials. The numbers in parentheses below indicate their uniform numbers. John Parry became the second referee in a row to retire after officiating the Super Bowl after Gene Steratore, who retired after Super Bowl LII.
 Referee: John Parry (132)
 Umpire: Fred Bryan (11)
 Down judge: Ed Camp (134)
 Line judge: Jeff Bergman (32)
 Field judge: Steve Zimmer (33)
 Side judge: Eugene Hall (103)
 Back judge: Terrence Miles (111)
 Replay Official: Jim Lapetina
 Replay Assistant: Chad Adams
 Alternate Referee: Ron Torbert (62)
 Alternate Umpire: Mark Pellis (131)
 Alternate Wing: Tom Stephan (68)
 Alternate Deep: Michael Banks (72)
 Alternate Back Judge: Rich Martinez (39)

Celebration
On the morning of February 5, the Patriots celebration duck boat parade was held in Boston, starting at Boylston Street and ending at City Hall Plaza. The date of the parade was unseasonably warm for New England. The high temperature for the day was 65 degrees Fahrenheit, with a low of 40. Temperatures in Boston during this time of year average in the mid to low 40’s. It was attended by an estimated 1.5 million fans.

References

External links

 
 

Super Bowl
2018 National Football League season
2019 in American football
2019 in sports in Georgia (U.S. state)
2019 in Atlanta
American football competitions in Atlanta
2019 in American television
February 2019 sports events in the United States
Los Angeles Rams postseason
New England Patriots postseason